Professor Anthony Traill (1939–2007) was a linguist (specifically a phonetician), who was the world's foremost authority on a San (more broadly, a Khoisan) language called !Xóõ. He published widely on this language, including a dictionary of the language. !Xóõ is famous for having probably the largest consonant inventory of any language on the planet.

For the most part, Traill's publications addressed the phonetics of !Xóõ in relation to related San languages. He also contributed importantly to the Khoisan and Bantu instrumental phonetic literature on tone with respect to voice and breathy voice.

Traill was Professorial Research Fellow at Wits University for nearly the decade since he was Professor and Chair of Linguistics (until 1998), in the Department of Linguistics, at the University of the Witwatersrand, Johannesburg, South Africa. He spoke highly competent !Xóõ, having conducted research in the !Xóõ communities of Botswana on nearly 100 field trips over more than 35 years. He also spoke Zulu, Tsonga, Tswana and Afrikaans.

Traill developed one of the bumps that adult native !Xóõ speakers have on his larynx after speaking the language for a long time.

After a long illness, Traill died on April 26, 2007, in Johannesburg, survived by his wife, Jill, and children Stephen, Carol and Patrick.

Publications

Traill, Anthony. A !Xóõ Dictionary.  (edited by Rainer Vossen). University Frankfurt/Main: Johann Wolfgang Goethe.  , . Volume 9 of "Research in Khoisan Studies", which has .
Traill, Anthony (1986). Phonetic and Phonological Studies of !Xóõ Bushman. (Quellen Zur Khoisan-Forschung, No 1), John Benjamins, January 1, 1986, .
Traill, Anthony (1973). A Preliminary Sketch of !Xu) phonetics. Edinburgh University Department of Linguistics Work in Progress 6:1-23.
Traill, Anthony (1985). Phonetic and Phonological Studies in !Xoo Bushman. Hamburg: Helmut Buske Verlag.
 
Traill, Anthony. (1995). The Khoesan Languages. In Mesthrie, R. (ed.), Language in South Africa. 27-49. Cape Town: Cambridge University Press.

References

1939 births
2007 deaths
Linguists from South Africa
Academic staff of the University of the Witwatersrand
Linguists of Khoisan languages
20th-century linguists